Robert T. Garrity Jr. (born March 23, 1949) is an American politician. He served as a Republican member for the 78th district of the Louisiana House of Representatives.

Garrity attended the University of New Orleans and went on to the Loyola University New Orleans College of Law.

In 1988, Garrity was elected to represent the 78th district in the Louisiana House of Representatives, succeeding Eddie Doucet. In 1992, Garrity was succeeded by Shirley D. Bowler. He was a member of the nonprofit organization Ducks Unlimited.

References 

1949 births
Living people
Place of birth missing (living people)
Republican Party members of the Louisiana House of Representatives
20th-century American politicians
University of New Orleans alumni
Loyola University New Orleans College of Law alumni